Sir Charles Blyth  (born 14 May 1940), known as Chay Blyth, is a Scottish yachtsman and rower. He was the first person to sail single-handed non-stop westwards around the world (1971), on a 59-foot boat called British Steel.

Early life
Blyth was born in Hawick, Roxburghshire. He joined the British Army Parachute Regiment when he was 18 and was promoted to Sergeant at the age of 21.

Rowing and sailing career

Later he founded the Challenge Business to organise the 1992/1993 British Steel Challenge in 1989. This event allowed novices to sail around the world in a professionally organised race. In September 2007, Challenge Business went into administration after Sir Chay was unable to find a sponsor for the 2008-09 Global Challenge Race.

The British Steel Challenge was followed by two successive BT Global Challenge races in 1996/97 and 2000/01. However, a downturn in the sponsorship market meant that the 2004/2005 Global Challenge race set off without a title sponsor.

Business career
Sir Chay started the company Challenge Business, to operate first the British Steel Challenge 1992–93 and then the Global Challenge Round the World yacht races. The success of the British Steel Challenge carved the way for the future success of the Global Challenge races.

Sir Chay is chairman of Inspiring Performance. He also heads the board of directors at train company First Great Western – Greater Western franchise. He is non-executive chairman of the franchise which was formed to run the new and enlarged franchise from 1 April 2006. The franchise combines the previous First Great Western, First Great Western Link and Wessex Trains franchises.

As chairman of Challenge Business, he was the mentor for Dee Caffari on her successful bid to be the first woman to sail around the world against the prevailing winds and currents in 2005–2006.

Awards and accolades
In 1997, Blyth was created a Knight Bachelor for services to sailing.
A street has been named after him in his birth town of Hawick. It is known as "Chay Blyth Place".
3rd Worthing Scout Groups Blyth Cub Pack is named after him.
Awarded an Honorary Doctorate of Technology from Plymouth University in 1994.
The Chartered Institute of Marketing awarded The Companion of Honour to Sir Chay in 2000 for his services to the Profession of Marketing.

References

External links
 English Rose III
 The Circumnavigators Chapter 31 by Don Holm
 Grant Thornton Press Release
 British Steel Yacht Homepage<--- Broken link

1940 births
British Parachute Regiment soldiers
Commanders of the Order of the British Empire
Knights Bachelor
Living people
Ocean rowers
Sportspeople from Hawick
Recipients of the British Empire Medal
Scottish male rowers
Scottish male sailors (sport)
Scottish soldiers
Single-handed circumnavigating sailors
People in sports awarded knighthoods
Volvo Ocean Race sailors